DogTown is a National Geographic Channel series set at the Best Friends Animal Sanctuary, a  animal facility in southern Utah. It is a documentary-style program that profiles staff and volunteers as they care for dogs in need of homes. Many animals featured are severely abused or neglected or in need of specialized medical treatment. The goal is usually to secure each dog an adoptive home but if this is not possible, animals are cared for at the sanctuary for the remainder of their lives.

The show first aired on January 4, 2008, and continued for four seasons. The final episode aired on March 12, 2010. By participating in the series, the sanctuary aimed to raise public awareness of issues in animal welfare as well as funds for their life-saving work. Best Friends Animal Society has credited the show with dramatically improving membership, volunteer, and visitor numbers, as well as helping secure homes for many dogs on the program.

On June 10, 2015, The CW announced that it would add a revival of the series, titled Dog Town, USA, to its Saturday One Magnificent Morning block, beginning July 4, 2015.

Program Format
Each episode typically features three cases. Veterinarians Mike Dix and Patti Iampietro treat dogs in need of medical care, while behavioral issues are addressed by trainers John Garcia, Pat Whitacre, Ann Allums, Michelle Besmehn and Sherry Woodard.

In addition to the four seasons released by National Geographic, Best Friends Animal Society released a DVD titled "DogTown Unleashed," providing updates on various dogs and a behind-the-scenes looks at DogTown.

Michael Vick Dogs
In its second-season premiere, DogTown profiled the rehabilitation of four American pit bull Terriers rescued from the property of NFL player Michael Vick in April 2007. The dogs' placement with Best Friends was the subject of some controversy. Following their removal from the dogfighting compound both PETA and the Humane Society of the United States advocated the dogs be euthanized; a court ruling, however, allowed 22 of the most badly abused dogs to be placed at Best Friends for rehabilitation. Following their progress, one of the dogs, Georgia, went on to make media appearances with trainer John Garcia, including on The Ellen DeGeneres Show.

The two-hour episode featuring the Vick dogs rated well, becoming the National Geographic Channel's highest rating Friday night premiere and highest rating second-season premiere, in network history.

Episodes

Series overview

Season 1 (2008)

Season 2 (2008)

Season 3 (2009)

Season 4 (2010)

Home releases

Most episodes are also available in two volumes in the iTunes Store.

References

External links
DogTown sanctuary website
DogTown series website

National Geographic (American TV channel) original programming
Television shows about dogs
Dog training and behavior